The Independent Lutheran Diocese (ILD) is a small Confessional Lutheran Association currently headquartered in Klamath Falls, Oregon.

History

The ILD was originally founded in 2005 as the Old Lutheran Church in America (OLCA), being formed by an Independent Lutheran Pastor and by  Lutheran Church–Missouri Synod members who desired an alternate route to ordination as a Lutheran Pastor. In 2008 OLCA was renamed as the Independent Lutheran Diocese.

The ILD currently consists of eight churches. As of 2022, there were 22 pastors serving in the United States along with three international pastors in Canada, Japan and Australia, with three church bodies in altar and pulpit fellowship in India and Myanmar. Conferences are occasionally held with the clergy.

The ILD publishes books and operates a tuition-free long-distance learning seminary, the Independent Lutheran Seminary.

Worship
The ILD's "Common Liturgy" is nearly identical to the service liturgy  found on in The Lutheran Hymnal of 1941 and "Setting 3" of the Lutheran Service Book of 2006. The historic One-Year Lectionary is used in the ILD instead of the post-Vatican II Three-Year Lectionary or Revised Common Lectionary used by most liturgical Protestants in the United States.

Polity
Despite the implications of the denominational name, the ILD practices an Episcopal form of governance for the leadership of the association and the congregationalist form for individual congregations, who can make decisions based on its needs. Congregations hold legal title to their church buildings and other property.

References

 (Listed under former name as Old Lutheran Church in America)

External links

Lutheran denominations established in the 21st century
Lutheran denominations in North America